Greg Scott is a Manchester-based violinist and a protege of Pete Waterman. His first album “DUEL” ranked Number 1 in the UK Classical Charts.

Education
Scott graduated from Chetham's School of Music and then from Royal Northern College of Music.

Career
Scott started his music career performing as a violinist at the BBC Philharmonic Orchestra. However, Scott's music career came to limelight after meeting the music producer Pete Waterman. As a result, Scott debuted with performances at the London's The Royal Albert Hall.

Scott was a member of The National Youth Orchestra of Great Britain and has performed as a soloist with Bryan Ferry and KD lang.

Women’s magazine Company ranked Scott among the 50 most eligible bachelors in Britain.

Greg Scott has been quoted by numerous sources as a violinist and musician performing in the field of classical music with respect to both his live performances as well as his album.

References

External links
Official website

Year of birth missing (living people)
Living people
British violinists
21st-century violinists